The following outline is provided as an overview of and topical guide to law:
Law (article link) is the set of rules and principles (laws) by which a society is governed, through enforcement by governmental authorities.  Law is also the field that concerns the creation and administration of laws, and includes any and all legal systems.

Nature of law 
Law can be described as all of the following:

 Academic discipline – the body of knowledge given to - or received by - a disciple (student); a branch or sphere of knowledge, or field of study, that an individual has chosen to specialise in.
 one of the humanities – an academic discipline that studies the human condition, using methods that are primarily analytical, critical, or speculative, as distinguished from the mainly empirical approaches of the natural sciences.
 System – set of elements (often called 'components' instead) and relationships which are different from relationships of the set or its elements to other elements or sets.
 part of the legal system – legal scholarship and practice shapes how the law is interpreted and applied in societies

Legal systems
 List of national legal systems
 Common law
 Civil law (legal system)
 Religious law
 Bahá'í laws
 Biblical law, in Judaism and Christianity
 Canon law, in Christianity
 Canon (canon law) - a certain rule or norm of conduct or belief prescribed by the Church. The word "canon" comes from the Greek kanon, which in its original usage denoted a straight rod that was later the instrument used by architects and artificers as a measuring stick for making straight lines.
 Canons of the Apostles
 Canon law of the Anglican Communion
Canon law of the Church of England
Canon law of the Episcopal Church in the United States
 Canon law of the Catholic Church
Custom (Catholic canon law) - the repeated and constant performance of certain acts for a defined period of time, which, with the approval of the competent legislator, thereby acquire the force of law. A custom is an unwritten law introduced by the continuous acts of the faithful with the consent of the legitimate legislator. 
Decree (Catholic canon law) - an order or law made by a superior authority for the direction of others.
Dispensation (Catholic canon law) - the exemption from the immediate obligation of law in certain cases. Its object is to modify the hardship often arising from the rigorous application of general laws to particular cases, and its essence is to preserve the law by suspending its operation in such cases.
Interpretation (Catholic canon law) - canonists provide and obey rules for the interpretation and acceptation of words, in order that legislation is correctly understood and the extent of its obligation is determined.
Obrogation -  the enacting of a contrary law that is a revocation of a previous law. It may also be the partial cancellation or amendment of a law, decree, or legal regulation by the imposition of a newer one.
Promulgation (Catholic canon law) - the publication of a law by which it is made known publicly, and is required by canon law for the law to obtain legal effect.
 Halakha, in Judaism
 Hindu law
 Jain law
 Pāṭimokkha, in Theravada Buddhism
 Sharia, in Islam
Traditional Chinese law

Law by source
Canon (canon law)
Custom (customary law)
Custom (Catholic canon law)
Precedent of past judicial decisions (stare decisis)
Statutory law
Statute
Constitutional law
Constitution
Regulatory law
Juristic writings (such as legal treatises)
Sources of international law
Customary international law
Treaty

Branches of law

Public law 
Public law
Constitutional law
Tax law (revenue law)

Administrative law
Administrative law

Criminal law
Criminal law (penal law)
Criminal procedure

Substantive law and adjectival law
Substantive law
Procedural law

Law of persons
Person (Catholic canon law)

Civil law
Civil law (common law)
Civil procedure
Civil rights
Common law
Environmental law
Family law
Tort law
Contract law
Property law
Agency law

Laws by jurisdictional scope
International law
Public international law
Conflict of laws (Private international law)
Dualism (law)
Legal pluralism
Supranational law
Law of the European Union
Treaties of the European Union
Regulation (European Union)
Directive (European Union)
European Union decision
European Union legislative procedure
Municipal law
Federal law (National law)
State law
Local ordinance

History

History of law
Cuneiform law
Babylonian law
Ancient Greek law
Roman law
Early Germanic law
Legal history of the Catholic Church
Jus antiquum

Basic legal concepts
Ignorantia juris non excusat
Presumption of innocence
Presumption (canon law)
Treason
Rights (Outline)
Rule of law

People who have influenced law

Canon law
Aquinas, St. Thomas (wrote influential Treatise on Law)
Benedict XIV, Pope
Gratian ("Father of Canon Law", founder of canon law jurisprudence; canon law as legal system)
Hostiensis (most influential decretist)
Gregory IX, Pope (promulgated the Decretales Gregorii IX)
Gasparri, Pietro (codified the 1917 Code of Canon Law)
John Paul II, Pope (promulgated the 1983 Code of Canon Law and the 1990 Code of Canons of the Eastern Churches)
Penyafort, Raymond of (patron of canon lawyers, codified Decretales Gregorii IX)
Photios I of Constantinople (writer of a nomocanon)

Civil law
Napoleon
Justinian

Common law
Blackstone, Sir William
Holmes, Oliver Wendell

Other legal systems
Hammurabi
Moses
Muhammad

Lists 
Sources of law
Lists of legislation
Lists of case law
List of treaties

Legislatures
List of legislatures by country

Courts
List of constitutional courts
List of special tribunals and courts
List of courts in England and Wales
List of High Courts of India

Prisons
List of prisons
List of United Kingdom prisons
United States
List of U.S. federal prisons
List of U.S. state prisons
List of U.S. military prisons

International law
Environmental agreements
List of international public law topics
List of international trade topics
List of international declarations

Judges
List of judges of the High Court of Australia
List of chief justices of the Supreme Court of Canada
List of justices of the Supreme Court of the United States
List of justices of the Supreme Court of the United States by court composition
List of justices of the Supreme Court of the United States by seat
List of Lords of Appeal in Ordinary
List of Senators of the College of Justice

Privy council members
Historical lists of Privy Counsellors
List of current members of the British Privy Council
List of current members of the Queen's Privy Council for Canada
List of members of the Privy Council of Northern Ireland
List of members of the Queen's Privy Council for Canada

Caselaw
List of copyright case law
List of Judicial Committee of the Privy Council cases
List of United Kingdom House of Lords cases
List of notable United Kingdom House of Lords cases
List of Supreme Court of Canada cases
List of United States Supreme Court cases

Legislation
List of Uniform Acts (United States)
List of United States federal legislation

Other
List of business law topics
Outline of criminal justice
List of topics in logic
List of environmental law journals
List of legal abbreviations
List of Ayatollahs
List of individuals executed by the federal government of the United States
List of law journals
List of jurists
List of Latin phrases
List of Latin legal terms
List of largest law firms by revenue
Lists of law schools
List of national legal systems
List of protective service agencies
List of real estate topics
List of riots
List of software patents
List of top United States patent recipients

External links
 Legal news and information network for attorneys and other legal professionals
 Encyclopaedic project of the academic initiative in JurisPedia
 Legal articles, news, and interactive maps
 WorldLII – World Legal Information Institute
 CommonLII – Commonwealth Legal Information Institute
 AsianLII – Asian Legal Information Institute
 AustLII – Australasian Legal Information Institute
 BAILII – British and Irish Legal Information Institute
 CanLII – Canadian Legal Information Institute
 NZLII – New Zealand Legal Information Institute
 PacLII – Pacific Islands Legal Information Institute

Notes

law
law

mk:Преглед на право